Mulock may refer to:

People
 Al Mulock (1926–1968), Canadian actor
 Dinah Mulock alias Dinah Craik (1826–1887), English novelist and poet
 George Mulock DSO (1882–1963), British naval officer, Antarctic surveyor and explorer
 Redford Henry Mulock (1886–1961), Canadian flying ace of World War I
 Ron Mulock (1930–2014), Australian politician
 T. J. Mulock (born 1985), Canadian-German professional ice hockey forward
 Tyson Mulock (born 1983), Canadian professional ice hockey centre
 William Mulock, PC, KCMG, MP, QC, LL.D (1843–1944), Canadian lawyer, politician, judge and philanthropist
 William Pate Mulock, PC (1897–1954), Canadian politician

Places
 Mulock Glacier, in Antarctica
 Mulock Inlet, re-entrant between Capes Teall and Lankester
 Mulock, Ontario (disambiguation), one of several places in Ontario, Canada

See also
 Sir William Mulock Secondary School, secondary school in Newmarket, Ontario, Canada